The men's 400 m freestyle swimming events for the 2016 Summer Paralympics took place at the  Olympic Aquatics Stadium from 8 to 15 September. A total of seven events were contested for seven different classifications.

Competition format
Each event consists of two rounds: heats and final. The top eight swimmers overall in the heats progress to the final. If there are eight or fewer swimmers in an event, no heats are held and all swimmers qualify for the final.

Results

S6

17:30 13 September 2016:

S7

17:44 14 September 2016:

S8

The S8 event took place on 8 September.

S9

The S9 event took place on 9 September.

S10

17:57 15 September 2016:

S11

The S11 event took place on 10 September.

S13

17:30 12 September 2016:

References

Swimming at the 2016 Summer Paralympics